Tanja Larsson (born 7 July 1977 in Haslev) is a Danish politician, who is a member of the Folketing for the Social Democrats political party. She entered parliament on 1 October 2019 as a replacement for Henrik Sass Larsen after he resigned his seat.

Political career
Larsson ran in the 2019 Danish general election, where she received 4,197 votes. This was not enough for her to get elected, but she became the Social Democrats' primary substitute in the Zealand constituency. When Henrik Sass Larsen resigned his seat in parliament on 1 October 2019, Larsson replaced him and took over the seat.

References

External links 
 Biography on the website of the Danish Parliament (Folketinget)

1977 births
Living people
People from Faxe Municipality
Social Democrats (Denmark) politicians
21st-century Danish women politicians
Women members of the Folketing
Members of the Folketing 2019–2022